The shadowy broad-nosed bat (Platyrrhinus umbratus) is a species of bat in the family Phyllostomidae. It is found in Colombia and Venezuela.

References

Platyrrhinus
Mammals of Colombia
Mammals of Venezuela
Mammals described in 1902
Taxonomy articles created by Polbot
Bats of South America
Taxa named by Marcus Ward Lyon Jr.